The 494th Fighter Squadron (494th FS), nicknamed the Panthers, is part of the 48th Fighter Wing at RAF Lakenheath, United Kingdom, where they operate the McDonnell Douglas F-15E Strike Eagle.

Mission
The 494th FS is a combat-ready McDonnell Douglas F-15E Strike Eagle squadron capable of executing strategic attack, interdiction, and counter air missions in support of United States Air Forces in Europe, United States European Command, and NATO operations. It employs the full array of air superiority and surface attack munitions to include the most advanced precision-guided weapons in the USAF inventory. The squadron is capable of deploying to any theater of operations in the world.

History

World War II
Activated as a Southeastern Air District Army Air Corps training squadron, equipped with a variety of second-line aircraft, both single and twin engine, preparing its pilots and maintenance crews for eventual combat. After the Pearl Harbor Attack, the squadron flew antisubmarine patrols from, March–April 1942. Resumed aircrew training, many of the group's members went on to serve in squadrons stationed in Europe and the Pacific theaters.

Eventually coming under the AAF III Fighter Command in 1944, trained replacement pilots with P-47 Thunderbolts, Converted in January 1944 to an operational fighter squadron with the end of RTU training. Deployed to the European Theater of Operations (ETO), being assigned to the IX Fighter Command in England, March 1944.

Almost immediately after their arrival, the squadron began a rigorous training program, flying dive-bombing, glide bombing, night flying, low-level navigation, smoke laying, reconnaissance, and patrol convoy sorties. Over the next two months, the number of sorties steadily increased and the squadron flew its first combat mission on 20 April 1944—an uneventful fighter sweep of the occupied French coast.

Assisted the Normandy invasion by dropping bombs on bridges and gun positions, attacking rail lines and trains, and providing visual reconnaissance reports. Moved to France in mid-June 1944, supporting ground operations of Allied forces moving east across northern France throughout the war: primarily providing support for the United States First Army. Eventually was stationed in Occupied Germany on V-E Day.

On 5 July 1945, the squadron arrived in Laon, France. After a few weeks back in France the squadron received orders to return to the US. With many of the members separating at port, those remaining set up the headquarters at Seymour Johnson Field, North Carolina, and was programmed for deployment to Okinawa to take part in planned Invasion of Japan. Training discontinued after Atomic bombings of Hiroshima and Nagasaki and the sudden end of the Pacific War.

Two months later on 7 November 1945, the squadron inactivated as part of the massive postwar draw down.

Cold War

Reactivated in 1952 as a NATO Fighter-Bomber squadron assigned to France. Equipped initially with F-84G Thunderjets, upgraded in 1954 to F-86F Sabre aircraft. conducted operational readiness exercises and tactical evaluations. Honing bombing and gunnery skills. The squadron frequently deployed to Wheelus AB, Libya for training.

Then in late 1956 the squadron upgraded to the F-100D Super Sabre. However the nuclear-weapon capable F-100 caused disagreements with France concerning atomic storage and custody issues within NATO, resulting in a decision to remove Air Force atomic-capable units from French soil. On 15 January 1960, the squadron and its host 48th TFW moved to RAF Lakenheath, UK.

Between 1960 and 1972 the squadron's F-100 fleet maintained its readiness by participating in a number of USAFE and NATO exercises training to react to possible aggression from the Soviet Union. They underwent a series of NATO tactical evaluations. The squadron conducted several deployments to Turkey, Italy, Spain, and across the United Kingdom.

Beginning in late 1971 the squadron started its conversion to the McDonnell Douglas F-4D Phantom II, with the aircraft being transferred from the 81st TFW at RAF Bentwaters. The conversion to the F-4D took several years, with the last F-100 departing in August 1974. With the arrival of the Phantoms, the F-4s adopted a common tail code of "LK". This tail code lasted only a few months as in July and August 1972 the 48th TFW further recoded to "LN".

The F-4's service with squadron was short as operation "Ready Switch" transferred the F-4D assets to the 474th TFW at Nellis AFB Nevada. The 474th sent their General Dynamics F-111As to the 347th TFW at Mountain Home AFB Idaho, and the 347th sent their F-111Fs to Lakenheath in early 1977. Unlike the previous F-4 transition, the F-111 change took place quickly and without any significant problems. Almost immediately after changing aircraft, the squadron began a series of monthly exercises and deployments that took the Liberty Wing to Italy, Iran, Greece, and Pakistan.

The 494th also participated in Operation El Dorado Canyon, the air raid on Tripoli, Libya on 14 and 15 April 1986. It flew combat missions in Southwest Asia from, January–February 1991 as part of Operation Desert Storm.

Modern era
In the midst of the organizational changes, the squadron switched aircraft again, exchanging the F-111s for the F-15E Strike Eagle in early February 1992. The Strike Eagle represented a change from a strictly ground attack role to a dual role mission for the 494th: air interdiction and air superiority.

The squadron participated in Operation Odyssey Dawn in Libya in March 2011, along with numerous deployments to Southwest Asia supporting Air Expeditionary units as part of the ongoing Global War on Terrorism as part of Operation Iraqi Freedom (OIF) and Operation Enduring Freedom (OEF).

When squadron components are the primary force provider deploying to support Air Expeditionary operations the provisional unit is designated as the 494th Expeditionary Fighter Squadron.

In spring of 2019, the 494th Fighter Squadron was announced as the recipient of the 2018 Raytheon Trophy. The squadron received the 66-year-old trophy, a servicewide award sponsored by defense contractor Raytheon, for its overall performance and in recognition of its six-month deployment to the Middle East.

Lineage
 Constituted as the 57th Bombardment Squadron (Light) on 20 November 1940
 Activated on 15 January 1941
 Redesignated 57th Bombardment Squadron (Dive) on 28 August 1942
 Redesignated 494th Fighter Bomber Squadron on 10 August 1943
 Redesignated 494th Fighter Squadron, Single Engine on 30 May 1944
 Inactivated on 7 November 1945
 Redesignated 494th Fighter-Bomber Squadron on 25 June 1952
 Activated on 10 July 1952
 Redesignated 494th Tactical Fighter Squadron on 8 July 1958
 Redesignated 494th Fighter Squadron on 30 November 1991

Assignments
 48th Bombardment Group (later 48th Fighter-Bomber Group, 48 Fighter Group), 15 January 1941 – 7 November 1945
 48th Fighter-Bomber Group, 10 July 1952
 48th Fighter-Bomber Wing (later 48th Tactical Fighter Wing, 48th Fighter Wing), 8 December 1957
 Attached to 48th Fighter Wing [Provisional], 2 September 1990 – 15 March 1991
 Attached to 7440th Composite Wing, September–December 1991
 48th Operations Group, 31 March 1992 – present

Stations
 Savannah Army Air Base, Georgia, 15 January 1941
 Will Rogers Field, Oklahoma, 23 May 1941
 Savannah Army Air Base, Georgia, 7 February 1942
 Key Field, Mississippi, 28 June 1942
 William Northern Field, Tennessee, 15 August 1943
 Walterboro Army Air Field, South Carolina, 27 January – 13 March 1944
 RAF Ibsley (Station 347), England, 29 March 1944
 Deux Jumeaux Airfield (A-4), France, 4 July 1944
 Vélizy-Villacoublay (A-42), France, 29 August 1944
 Cambrai/Niergnies Airfield (A-74), France (1944)
 Sint-Truiden Airfield (A-92), Belgium, 15 September 1944
 Kelz Airfield (Y-54), Germany, 26 March 1945
 Kassel-Rothwestern Airfield (R-12), Germany, c. 17 April 1945
 Illesheim Airfield (R-10), Germany, 29 April 1945
 Laon, France, 5 July–August 1945
 Seymour Johnson Field, North Carolina, 9 September – 7 November 1945
 Chaumont-Semoutiers Air Base, France, 10 July 1952
 RAF Lakenheath, England, 15 January 1960 – present
 Deployed to: Ta’if, Saudi Arabia, 2 September 1990 – 15 March 1991
 Deployed to: Incirlik Air Base, Turkey, September–December 1991
 Deployed to: Aviano, Italy, 48 EFW alongside Triple Nickel 555th F-16 squadron, March–June 1999

Aircraft

Operations
 World War II
 Operation El Dorado Canyon
 Operation Desert Storm
 Operation Allied Force
Operation Enduring Freedom
 Operation Iraqi Freedom
 Operation Odyssey Dawn
Operation Inherent Resolve

See also

References

Notes
 Explanatory notes

 Citations

Bibliography

 
 
 

Further reading
 
 McAuliffe, Jerome J. U.S. Air Force in France, 1950–1967. 2005.

External links

 48th Operations Group Fact Sheet

494
Fighter squadrons of the United States Army Air Forces